Akhvakh (also rendered Ahwah) may refer to:
The Akhvakh language
The Akhvakh people